Snuff is the 39th novel in the Discworld series, written by Terry Pratchett. It was published on 11 October 2011 in the United States, and 13 October 2011 in the United Kingdom. The book is the third-fastest-selling novel in the United Kingdom since records began, having sold over 55,000 copies in the first three days.

The book is the eighth City Watch story and is based largely around Commander Sir Sam Vimes. Pratchett emphasised that the word 'snuff' has "at least two meanings".

Synopsis
Commander Sam Vimes is forced by his wife, Lady Sybil, to take a holiday with their son, Young Sam, at her family's mansion Crundells. After a short time of enjoying his holiday, he discovers that the rural community has a dark past with the resident goblins, humanoid lifeforms that live in caves nearby. Vimes finds out that the son of Lord Rust has been enslaving goblins to force them to work on his tobacco plantations in Howondaland, allowing him to manufacture cigars cheaply that are then smuggled to Ankh-Morpork. After teaming up with the local constable, a young man called Upshot, Vimes manages to arrest those responsible for the crime.

In the end, thanks to his wife's organisational skills and powers of persuasion, goblins are recognised as citizens by all major nations and rulers. Rust's son is disinherited and exiled to Fourecks, where Lord Vetinari assures an eye will be kept on him.

Plot

Commander Vimes is persuaded by his wife Sybil and Lord Vetinari to take a family holiday at the Ramkins' countryside estate; Willikins, Vimes's thug-turned-butler, accompanies them. As Vimes arrives in the countryside, despite the silence and tranquillity, he senses crime.

At a dinner with all the local 'nobs' organised by Sybil, Vimes discovers the distaste the local people have towards goblins, calling them vermin and a nuisance, with a pub called the Goblin's Head having an eponymous stuffed and mounted goblin's head. At the dinner, he also meets Miss Felicity Beedle, a children's book author whose works Young Sam is a fan of, and he feels that she has something she wants to tell him about a possible crime.

The next day he participates in a hand-to-hand fight with the hot-headed local blacksmith, Jethro. After Vimes wins the fight, he arranges to meet with Jethro at Dead Man's Copse on Hangman Hill at midnight, as Jethro has something to tell Vimes about the mistreatment of goblins. Lord Rust then approaches Vimes and tells him that he will not find any crimes in the country, also warning him that he has no jurisdiction outside of Ankh-Morpork.

That night, Vimes and Willikins go up to Hangman Hill to find Jethro, but instead, they find the severed finger of a goblin girl and lots of blood. The next morning, the young local chief constable, Feeney Upshot, sworn to enact the will of the local Board of Magistrates rather than to uphold the law, arrives at Ramkin Hall to arrest Vimes for the murder of the blacksmith, who has gone missing. Vimes is considered the most likely suspect because he was in a fight with the blacksmith the night before, and he was overheard making plans to meet Jethro on Hangman Hill. However, Vimes refuses arrest, instead taking on the task of mentoring Upshot and teaching him to be a better copper, and together they start an investigation on the case.

Vimes and Upshot, led by a goblin named Stinky, find the goblins' abode in a cave. They enter into pitch-black darkness, and Vimes realises he can see perfectly in the darkness, a skill rewarded to him by the Summoning Dark (a demon that briefly possessed him in the novel Thud!. It is implied that the 'dark' and Vimes now have a mutual respect).

In the cave he meets with the goblin chief who leads him to a goblin's corpse, the same goblin that was killed on Hangman Hill. Vimes ventures further in the cave in search of the blacksmith, but he instead finds Miss Beedle, who, because of adoptive goblin ancestry, spends her spare time teaching goblin girls how to read and communicate with humans.

Upshot and Vimes then pay a visit to Mr Flutter; he is known as the 'local trouble' and seems to be involved in most crimes in the area. They capture Flutter, but he is unwilling to say much. Vimes then notices a cellar in his house and enters it; surrounded by darkness he is able to communicate to the Summoning Dark. From the Summoning Dark, who represents all darkness, he is able to get a witness account of what happened on Hangman Hill the other night and relays this to Flutter, who then tells Vimes that he protested against the killing of the goblin-girl, and whose murderer was a Mr Stratford, a man working for Gravid Rust, the 'entrepreneurial' son of Lord Rust.

After Sergeant Colon is possessed by the ghost of a goblin child after finding an unggue pot (a goblin burial pot) inside a free cigar, parallel investigations by the Ankh-Morpork City Watch and Vimes lead to the revelation that goblins are being used for slave labour on tobacco plantations in Howondaland. Vimes also finds out that three years ago, large numbers of goblins were taken from their caves to work at the plantation. In this incident, many goblins were killed, abused and starved to death. Wee Mad Arthur of the Watch flies to Howondaland to investigate and finds the plantation, where all the goblin workers are dying or already dead.

Vimes and Upshot hear that more goblins have been taken and are now being transported on the paddleboat The 'Wonderful Fanny'. Vimes and Upshot secretly board the boat just as a thunder storm arrives, making the night pitch-black and the river laden with debris and thus deadly. Vimes, with the help of Stinky, frees the goblins who are trapped in the cargo holds. He also rescues the captain's wife and daughter from being shot by Stratford, who had been posing as an underling. He then heads towards the captain and his captor.

A battle ensues between Vimes and Stratford when the boat once again lifts on the tide, giving Stratford time to escape. After Vimes comes round from a knock to the head he surmises that Stratford is not dead and will be back to finish what he started. The captain of the boat loses track of the riverbends during the commotion and panics. Vimes's ability to see in the dark allows him to guide the boat to safety, and for this he is awarded the title 'King of the River'.

Vimes is knocked unconscious in the storm and wakes to find himself and the boat in Quirm, everyone having survived the night. Vimes quickly discovers that the goblins, along with Stratford, have already boarded the next boat to Howondaland. Vimes boards the boat and arrests the Captain and frees all the goblins once and for all as well as a kidnapped Jethro, but Stratford is not on board.

Vimes returns to his family in Ramkin Hall and together they travel to Quirm on the pleasure boat Roberta E. Biscuit. Stratford attempts to attack Vimes's son and is defeated by Vimes and Willikins and handed over to the Quirmian gendarmerie, to be returned to Ankh-Morpork for trial. On the way the prison coach crashes, Stratford escapes and kills a guard. However, shortly after he is met on the road and killed by Willikins.

Meanwhile, Lady Sybil arranges a concert in the Ankh-Morpork Opera House, inviting the Patrician, Lady Margalotta Von Uberwald, and the ambassadors to Diamond King of Trolls and the Low-King of Dwarves. The aim of the concert is to showcase the musical talent of one of the goblin girls taught by Miss Beedle. The dignitaries are so moved by the display they agree to enact laws which will grant goblins the same rights as other sapient creatures and protection under the law. Gravid Rust, primarily due to his trafficking of troll narcotics, is disinherited and exiled to Forecks, much to Vimes's chagrin as he is left unpunished for the enslavement of goblins. However, it is implied that Gravid is monitored (and possibly killed) by one of Vetinari's Dark Clerks. One year later, Vimes and Lady Sybil return to the countryside to attend a wedding, where he learns that the events of the novel have been turned into a novel, Pride and Extreme Prejudice, in which he is the main character.

Reception
In a review for The Guardian, A. S. Byatt noted that the book connected two different meanings of Snuff ("an old-fashioned stimulant to be kept in elegant boxes and snorted gracefully in society" and "arbitrary and unpleasant deaths"). Byatt also noted the "great deal of interest in bodily fluids, excretions and excrement" in the book. At the end of the review, Byatt called Pratchett a master storyteller, and said he was endlessly inventive.

Snuff won the 2012 Bollinger Everyman Wodehouse Prize and was nominated for the 2012 Locus Award for Best Fantasy Novel as well as the Prometheus Award.

References

External links

 

Discworld books
2011 fantasy novels